Kevin Adrian Wright (born 12 December 1995) is a professional footballer who plays as a left back for USL Championship club Oakland Roots. Born in England, Wright represents the Sierra Leone national team.

Career
Wright joined Chelsea's academy in 2005 as an under-11. He went on to play for the club's development squad between 2014 and 2016. On 30 June 2016, Chelsea announced that Wright would be leaving the London-based club on the expiry of his contract.

On 1 December 2016, after trialing with Cumbrian side Carlisle United for several weeks, he was finally recruited by manager Keith Curle, along with former Tottenham Hotspur trainee Alexander McQueen on a contract until 1 January 2017. Five days later, Wright made his Carlisle debut in a 3–2 defeat against Mansfield Town in the EFL Trophy, in which he replaced the injured Joe McKee at half-time. On 19 January 2017, it was announced that Carlisle had terminated Wright's contract.

On 27 January 2017, Wright joined Norwegian side Fredrikstad, following his release from Carlisle.

On 2 March 2022, Wright signed a three-year contract with Sirius in Sweden.

In August 2022, Wright joined Greek Super League 2 club Apollon Smyrnis.

On 18 January 2023, Wright signed with USL Championship side Oakland Roots SC.

Personal life
Born in England, Wright is of Sierra Leonean descent. He debuted with the Sierra Leone national football team in a friendly 2–1 loss to Mauritania on 9 October 2020.

Career statistics

Honours 
Chelsea Reserves
 FA Youth Cup: 2013–14

References

External links

Kevin Wright at Fotbolltransfers.com

1995 births
Living people
People with acquired Sierra Leonean citizenship
Sierra Leonean footballers
Association football defenders
Fredrikstad FK players
Degerfors IF players
Örebro SK players
IK Sirius Fotboll players
Norwegian First Division players
Superettan players
Allsvenskan players
Sierra Leone international footballers
Sierra Leonean expatriate footballers
Sierra Leonean expatriate sportspeople in Norway
Expatriate footballers in Norway
Sierra Leonean expatriate sportspeople in Sweden
Expatriate footballers in Sweden
Footballers from Ilford
English footballers
Chelsea F.C. players
Carlisle United F.C. players
English Football League players
English expatriate footballers
English expatriate sportspeople in Norway
English expatriate sportspeople in Sweden
English sportspeople of Sierra Leonean descent
Sierra Leone Creole people
2021 Africa Cup of Nations players
English expatriate sportspeople in Greece
Apollon Smyrnis F.C. players
Super League Greece 2 players
Expatriate footballers in Greece
Oakland Roots SC players
English expatriate sportspeople in the United States
Expatriate soccer players in the United States